Joseph Weisenthal (born September 2, 1980) is an American journalist, television presenter and podcaster. He is the executive editor of news for Bloomberg's digital brands, the co-anchor of What’d You Miss? on Bloomberg Television, and co-host of the Odd Lots podcast with Tracy Alloway on Bloomberg Podcasts.

Early life and education
Joseph Weisenthal was born on September 2, 1980, in Detroit, Michigan. He graduated from the University of Texas at Austin in 2002 with a degree in political science.

Career
In 2004, Weisenthal co-created the markets blog TheStalwart.com with his friend Vincent Fernando, which published discussions about current stocks, finance, business, and economics. Weisenthal wrote for the technology news blog Techdirt as an analyst between March 2006 and September 2007.

In October 2008, Weisenthal joined Business Insider as lead financial blogger covering markets, finance, and economics, and in February 2013, became executive editor of the website.

In October 2014, Weisenthal left Business Insider and joined Bloomberg L.P. the same month as managing editor of Bloomberg's online markets and finance coverage, running the newly created Bloomberg Markets website.

In June 2015, Weisenthal joined the newly created markets show What'd You Miss?, which he co-anchored with Alix Steel on Bloomberg Television. The show is named after one of Weisenthal's most often-used expressions, "What'd I miss?", which he tweets almost every morning. As of July 2021, the show is co-anchored by Weisenthal, Caroline Hyde, and Romaine Bostick.

Since 2015, Weisenthal and Tracy Alloway, an executive editor for Bloomberg News based in Hong Kong, have co-hosted the business and finance podcast Odd Lots, which as of 2021 is released twice a week on Monday and Thursday, on Bloomberg Podcasts and other podcasting platforms.

In November 2016, Weisenthal became the executive editor of news for Bloomberg's digital brands.

References

External links
 
 Joe Weisenthal at Bloomberg L.P.

1980 births
Living people
American journalists
American television hosts
American television journalists
University of Texas at Austin alumni
Bloomberg L.P. people